Nicole Heavirland (born February 25, 1995) is an American rugby union player. She was named in the Eagles 2017 Women's Rugby World Cup squad. She came out as gay in March 2022.

Biography 
Heavirland attended Glacier High School in her junior year before she transferred to Phillips Exeter Academy. She began playing rugby at the age of 15. She made her rugby sevens debut during the 2015–16 World Rugby Women's Sevens Series. She travelled as a reserve to the 2016 Brazil Olympics. She was a USA Rugby All-American at the United States Military Academy.

Heavirland was among 12 players selected to represent Team USA at the Tokyo 2020 Olympic Games. She was again selected to represent the United States at the 2022 Rugby World Cup Sevens in Cape Town.

References

External links 
Official Website
Nicole Heavirland at USA Rugby
 Nicole Heavirland at Army West Point Athletics
 
 
 

1995 births
Living people
United States women's international rugby union players
American female rugby union players
Female rugby sevens players
Rugby union fly-halves
Phillips Exeter Academy alumni
American female rugby sevens players
Rugby sevens players at the 2020 Summer Olympics
Olympic rugby sevens players of the United States
21st-century American women
Lesbian sportswomen
LGBT rugby union players
American LGBT sportspeople